The western small flower moth (Schinia perminuta) is a moth of the family Noctuidae. It is found in California.

The wingspan is about 15 mm.

External links
Images
Bug Guide

Schinia
Moths of North America
Moths described in 1881